Maddalena Grassano (born 4 May 1949) is an Italian former sprinter. She competed in the women's 4 × 100 metres relay at the 1972 Summer Olympics.

References

External links
 

1949 births
Living people
Athletes (track and field) at the 1972 Summer Olympics
Italian female sprinters
Olympic athletes of Italy
Mediterranean Games gold medalists for Italy
Mediterranean Games medalists in athletics
Athletes (track and field) at the 1971 Mediterranean Games
People from Alessandria
Olympic female sprinters
Sportspeople from the Province of Alessandria
20th-century Italian women
21st-century Italian women